Maher Meshaal (born 1989), known as Abu al-Zubair al-Jazrawi, was a Saudi Arabian munshid (a singer of anasheed or Arabic  a cappella chants) and mujahid.

History
Meshaal was born in al-Qassim Region, Saudi Arabia.

He was well known in his home country for appearing on a TV program for an anasheed competition before he emigrated to join the Islamic State (ISIL) in 2013. He also appeared on al-Bidayah TV Channel. He became famous as the singer behind some of their most famous and popular anasheed which are regularly played as background music in combat and execution videos released by Islamic State. Meshaal spent five years working as an munshid and an imam at a mosque in Riyadh, Saudi Arabia, before joining ISIL in April 2013, the Saudi Gazette claims.

Death

He was killed by a US airstrike around 11 July 2015 near the Syrian city of al-Hasakah.

On 9 January 2016, ISIL released a ten-minute documentary-style video titled "Nay they are alive with their Lord", a reference to Qur'an verse Ali 'Imran 3:169, celebrating Meshaal's life and exploits in his own words.

References

2015 deaths
Saudi Arabian Muslims
Assassinated ISIL members
Deaths by American airstrikes during the Syrian civil war
1989 births